John Paul Jones (November 18, 1924 – 1999) was an American painter and printmaker, described as "one of America's foremost printmakers" in the 1950s and '60s.

He had a write-up in Time magazine in 1962. In 1963 he had a retrospective exhibition of his prints and drawings at The Brooklyn Museum, New York City. A posthumous retrospective exhibition was held at the Laguna Art Museum, Laguna Beach, in 2010.

Jones was a resident of Laguna Beach, California from the 1960s until 1990.

Sources
Una E. Johnson, John Paul Jones. Prints and Drawings. 1948-1963, New York, The Brooklyn Museum, 1963.

Footnotes

1924 births
1999 deaths
People from Indianola, Iowa
Painters from Iowa
People from Laguna Beach, California
20th-century American painters
American male painters
20th-century American printmakers
20th-century American male artists